Midnight McCartney is a tribute album by John Pizzarelli to Paul McCartney, including tracks from Wings. It was released in 2015 with Concord.

According to the album's press release, Paul McCartney suggested John Pizzarelli perform tracks from his canon, and offered the title. Pizzarelli had previously performed Beatles songs in his 1996 album Meets the Beatles.

John's wife Jessica Molaskey, daughter Madeleine Pizzarelli, father Bucky Pizzarelli, and brother Martin Pizzarelli all performed on the album.

Reception

Writing for AllMusic, Stephen Thomas Erlewine praised the source material, but commented the "key to the record's success is Pizzarelli himself, who delivers upon the laid-back promise of the title but is savvier than he needed to be, which is why Midnight McCartney satisfies."

Christopher Loudon wrote for the JazzTimes that "the set’s not all midnight lace. Indeed, lovely as everything wrapped in Pizzarelli’s trademark silken lilt is, the more adventurous selections are more interesting."

The Times music critic Chris Pearson described the album as "delightful."

In an interview with Pizzarelli, James Wood from Guitar World commented the tracks were "all tastefully done in Pizzarelli’s trademark style."

Track listing

Personnel

Musicians
 John Pizzarelliguitar, primary artist 
 Katherine Finkflute (alto)
 Pamela Sklarflute (Alto)
 Tony Kadlecktrumpet
 John Moscatrombone
 Andy Fuscosax (alto)
 Harry Allensaxophone (tenor), soloist 
 Chris Cardonaviola
 Mairi Dorman Phaneufcello
 Bucky Pizzarelliguitar (rhythm), soloist
 Paul Woodielviolin
 Robin Zehviolin 
 Hélio Alvespiano
 Larry Goldingsorgan, piano
 Konrad Paszkudzkipiano, bass
 Martin Pizzarellibass
 Duduka Dafonsecadrums, percussion
 Kevin Kannerdrums
 Don Sebeskyorchestration
 Michael McDonaldprimary artist, vocals
 Jessica Molaskeyvocals (background)
 Madeleine Pizzarellivocals (background)
 Linda McCartneycomposer
 Paul McCartneycomposer

Support
 John Pizzarelliarranger
 Chris Byarscopyist
 Holger Ecksteinphotography
 Larry Goldingsarranger
 Rachel Gutekdesign
 Jessica Molaskeyproducer
 Bill Mossengineer, mastering, mixing

References

External links
 
 
 
 

2015 albums
John Pizzarelli albums
The Beatles tribute albums
Concord Records albums